Zenghu Chang(常增虎) is a laser researcher in the Physics department at the University of Central Florida who is an author and coauthor of over 350 articles which carry the h-index of 39. His team developed the world's shortest laser pulse in 2013 and was given $6.9 million from the Defense Advanced Research Projects Agency in the U.S. to strengthen the pulses for ultrafast sensors. He is partnering with researchers from other Universities on the project.
Since 2018 he is fellow of the National Academy of Inventors.

Biography
Zenghu Chang is a University Trustee Chair, Pegasus and Distinguished Professor at the University of Central Florida, where he directs the Institute for the Frontier of Attosecond Science and Technology. He is a fellow of the American Physical Society and Optical Society of America. Chang graduated from Xi’an Jiaotong University in China with a bachelor's degree in 1982. He then earned a master's and a doctorate at the Xi’an Institute of Optics and Precision Mechanics, Chinese Academy of Sciences, in 1985 and 1988 respectively. From 1991 to 1993, Chang visited the Central Laser Facility at the Rutherford Appleton Laboratory sponsored by the Royal Society fellowship. He worked at the Center for Ultrafast Optical Science at the University of Michigan as a research fellow and a research scientist after 1996. Then joined the physics faculty at Kansas State University in 2001 and later became the Ernest & Lillian Chapin Professor. In 2010, Chang started the joined faculty position in CREOL and physics department at the University of Central Florida in Orlando.

References

Laser researchers
Living people
University of Central Florida faculty
Year of birth missing (living people)
Fellows of the American Physical Society